Cochran County is a county located in the U.S. state of Texas. As of the 2020 census, its population was 2,547. The county seat is Morton. The county was created in 1876 and later organized in 1924. It is named for Robert E. Cochran, a defender of the Alamo.

Geography
Cochran County lies on the high plains of the Llano Estacado. The western border of the county lies along the border of Texas and New Mexico.

Major highways
  State Highway 114
  State Highway 125
  State Highway 214

Adjacent counties
 Bailey County (north)
 Lamb County (northeast)
 Hockley County (east)
 Terry County (southeast)
 Yoakum County (south)
 Lea County, New Mexico (southwest/Mountain Time Zone)
 Roosevelt County, New Mexico (northwest/Mountain Time Zone)

Demographics

Note: the US Census treats Hispanic/Latino as an ethnic category. This table excludes Latinos from the racial categories and assigns them to a separate category. Hispanics/Latinos can be of any race.

As of the census of 2000, there were 3,730 people, 1,309 households, and 1,017 families living in the county.  The population density was 5 people per square mile (2/km2).  There were 1,587 housing units at an average density of 2 per square mile (1/km2).  The racial makeup of the county was 64.48% White, 4.53% Black or African American, 0.83% Native American, 0.21% Asian, 0.05% Pacific Islander, 27.35% from other races, and 2.55% from two or more races.  44.13% of the population were Hispanic or Latino of any race.

There were 1,309 households, out of which 38.10% had children under the age of 18 living with them, 63.80% were married couples living together, 9.90% had a female householder with no husband present, and 22.30% were non-families. 20.90% of all households were made up of individuals, and 11.10% had someone living alone who was 65 years of age or older.  The average household size was 2.79 and the average family size was 3.25.

In the county, the population was spread out, with 31.50% under the age of 18, 8.00% from 18 to 24, 24.90% from 25 to 44, 21.20% from 45 to 64, and 14.40% who were 65 years of age or older.  The median age was 35 years. For every 100 females there were 92.10 males.  For every 100 females age 18 and over, there were 93.30 males.

The median income for a household in the county was $27,525, and the median income for a family was $31,163. Males had a median income of $25,064 versus $17,652 for females. The per capita income for the county was $13,125.  About 21.40% of families and 27.00% of the population were below the poverty line, including 37.20% of those under age 18 and 11.70% of those age 65 or over.

Communities
 Bledsoe
 Morton (county seat)
 Whiteface

Politics

Education
School districts serving the county include:
 Morton Independent School District
 Sudan Independent School District
 Whiteface Consolidated Independent School District

Three Way Independent School District formerly served a part of Cochran County. It closed in 2002, becoming a part of Sudan ISD.

The county is in the service area of South Plains College.

See also

 Recorded Texas Historic Landmarks in Cochran County

References

External links

 Cochran County government's website
 Cochran County in Handbook of Texas Online at the University of Texas
 Cochran County Profile from the Texas Association of Counties
 Photos of West Texas and Eastern New Mexico

 
1924 establishments in Texas
Populated places established in 1924
Majority-minority counties in Texas